Shanghai Madness is a 1933 American Pre-Code drama film directed by John G. Blystone and starring Spencer Tracy, Fay Wray, Ralph Morgan, and Albert Conti. It was released by Fox Film Corporation.

Plot

After attacking and destroying a Chinese outpost, an American officer is dismissed from the US Navy and instead finds himself in charge of a gunboat and tries to prevent a mission being overrun by Communist insurgents.

Cast
 Spencer Tracy as Pat Jackson
 Fay Wray as Wildeth Christie
 Ralph Morgan as Li Po Chang
 Eugene Pallette as Lobo Lonergass
 Herbert Mundin as Larsen
 Arthur Hoyt as Van Emery
 Albert Conti as Rigand
 Maude Eburne as Mrs. Glissen

References

External links
Shanghai Madness at IMDB

1933 films
1930s war drama films
American adventure films
Fox Film films
Films set in China
Seafaring films
American war drama films
Films produced by William Fox
American black-and-white films
1933 adventure films
1933 drama films
1930s English-language films
Films directed by John G. Blystone
1930s American films